Alejandro Gomez Sigala (born in Barquisimeto, Venezuela, 6 December 1960) is an equestrian. He took up dressage well into adulthood, and in a few years (2007 to the present) accumulated an extensive record of participation in national and international events.

Since 2009, his record of participation includes:

 2009 Bolivarian Games, Cochabamba, Bolivia: individual gold and overall gold
 2010 South American Games, Medellin, Colombia: individual gold, overall bronze, team bronze
 2010 Central American and Caribbean Games, Mayagüez, Puerto Rico: [Medalla de Plata PSG, cuarto de final individual y quinto general acumulado?]
 2011 Pan American Games, Guadalajara, Mexico: sixth place team
 2015 Pan American Games, Toronto, Canada: no medals
 2016 Adequan Global Dressage Festival CDI5, Wellington Florida, USA:
2017 Continental/Regional Games Bolivarian Games-D Bogotá (COL)

References

Living people
Venezuelan male equestrians
1960 births
Equestrians at the 2015 Pan American Games
Venezuelan dressage riders
South American Games gold medalists for Venezuela
South American Games bronze medalists for Venezuela
South American Games medalists in equestrian
Competitors at the 2010 South American Games
Sportspeople from Barquisimeto
Pan American Games competitors for Venezuela
21st-century Venezuelan people